Events from 1986 in England

Incumbent

Events

22 June – The England national football team's hopes of winning the World Cup are ended with a 2–1 defeat in the quarter-finals by Argentina, a game in which Diego Maradona is allowed a blatantly handballed goal.

Births

 28 January – Jessica Ennis-Hill, heptathlete

Deaths

See also
1986 in Northern Ireland
1986 in Scotland
1986 in Wales

References

 
England
Years of the 20th century in England
1980s in England